Michael Paul Jakubo (July 7, 1947 – April 4, 2019) was a Canadian professional ice hockey player.

During the 1972–73 season, Jakubo played seven games in the World Hockey Association with the Los Angeles Sharks. Jakubo was also a member of the independent London Lions team which played the 1973-74 season against the top European hockey teams. He died on April 4, 2019.

References

External links

1947 births
Canadian ice hockey left wingers
Columbus Golden Seals players
Denver Spurs players
Fort Wayne Komets players
Greensboro Generals (EHL) players
Greensboro Generals (SHL) players
Ice hockey people from Ontario
2019 deaths
London Lions (ice hockey) players
Los Angeles Sharks players
Sportspeople from Greater Sudbury
Tidewater Sharks players
Virginia Wings players
Canadian expatriate ice hockey players in England